William Chester may refer to:

William Chester (bishop) (died 1893), Church of Ireland bishop and author
Sir William Chester (mayor) (1509–1595?), Lord Mayor of London
Sir William Chester, Baronet of the Chester baronets
William Chester (MP for Derby), see Derby
William Chester (MP for Bristol), see Bristol

See also